Scott Allen Skiles Sr. (born March 5, 1964) is an American former basketball coach and player. He coached the Phoenix Suns, Chicago Bulls, Milwaukee Bucks and Orlando Magic. A first-round draft pick out of Michigan State University, Skiles played ten seasons as a point guard in the  NBA. He holds the NBA record for assists in one game with 30, set in his fifth season in the league and second with Orlando, in which he also earned the 1990–91 NBA Most Improved Player Award.

High school and college
In 1982, Skiles led Plymouth High School to the Indiana State Championship, scoring 39 points to lead the Pilgrims past the Gary Roosevelt Panthers in double overtime. During the 1982 season Skiles led the state in scoring, averaging 30.2 points per game. He set several Plymouth high school records during his career, including most points in a home game (53) and most points in an away game (56). He left Plymouth as the school's all-time career scoring leader (1,788 points), a record that would stand until 2005. Skiles had his number 22 jersey retired at Plymouth High School in 1992.

Skiles attended Michigan State University, where in his senior season he was a First Team All-America selection as well as the Big Ten Conference MVP and scoring champion. He left MSU as its all-time career scoring leader (2,145 points) and still holds the Spartans' record for most points scored in a season (850). While in East Lansing, he was arrested and charged with felony possession of cocaine and misdemeanor possession of marijuana. The cocaine charge was dropped, and Skiles pleaded guilty to the marijuana possession. He was arrested and charged with drunken driving a year later and served 15 days in jail. During his senior season, Skiles committed a parole violation on an earlier marijuana conviction, and served a brief jail sentence.

NBA career
The Milwaukee Bucks made Skiles the 22nd selection of the 1986 NBA draft. In ten seasons, he played for the Bucks (1986–87), Indiana Pacers (1987–89), Orlando Magic (1989–94), Washington Bullets (1994–95), and Philadelphia 76ers (1995–96).

Milwaukee Bucks
Skiles was seldom used his rookie season with the Bucks, averaging 3.8 points and 3.5 assists in just 13 games off the bench.

Indiana Pacers
With the Indiana Pacers the next season Skiles averaged even fewer minutes but played in more games, increasing his scoring marginally to 4.4 points and posting the same 3.5 assists per game in 50 games, just two of them starts.  He played in 80 games in 1988–89, starting just 13 and averaging 6.8 points and 4.9 assists in slightly under 20 minutes a game.

Orlando Magic
In 1989 Skiles was selected by the newly formed Orlando Magic in the NBA expansion draft. Mainly a backup point guard, he scored 7.7 points and posted 4.8 assists in 20.9 minutes per game in 70 games, 48 off the bench. In 1990–91 he transitioned to a starting role at the position, jumping to a career high 17.2 points and improved 8.4 assists in 34.4 minutes over 79 games and 66 starts. The season was highlighted on December 30, 1990, when Skiles racked up 30 assists in Orlando's 155–116 victory over the Denver Nuggets at Orlando Arena, breaking Kevin Porter's NBA single-game assists record (29). His well more than doubling scoring and nearly doubling his assists marks from the previous year earned him the NBA Most Improved Player Award.

The next year, 1991–92, was a bit of a backslide, dropping to 14.1 points and 7.3 assists in 31.7 minutes in 75 games, with games started, field goals made, field goal percentage, 2-pointers made, 2-point percentage, 3-pointers made, 3-point percentage, free throws, free throw percentage, offensive rebounds, defensive rebounds, total rebounds, and steals all falling off.

1992–93 saw a bouncing back nearly across the board, with scoring up to 15.4 points, a career high 9.4 assists, and career highs in shooting percentage and 2-point shooting percentage in a career high 39.6 minutes in 78 games, all starts.

Skiles played in all 82 games in 1993–94 but only started 46, showing severe drop-offs in minutes, field goals, field goal percentage, 2-pointers made, 2-point percentage, rebounds, assists, and scoring, posting just 9.9 points and 6.1 assists per game. Skiles began the year as a starter but in the second half of the season he became a reserve, leaving Penny Hardaway as his successor. Skiles was traded to the Washington Bullets in the offseason to create salary cap space.

Washington Bullets
As a Washington Bullets in 1994–95 Skiles' minutes were back up to 33.5 per game in just 62 games, all starts, and improvements were shown in virtually every statistical category, though points per game only rose to 13.0 and assists to 7.3.

Philadelphia 76ers
Skiles spent only a single season in Washington, moving on to the Philadelphia 76ers in his final NBA season in 1995–96.  Appearing in only 10 games Skiles stats backslid again, with only 6.3 points and 3.8 assists in 23.6 minutes per game over 9 starts.

Greek League

PAOK
Nursing a serious shoulder injury in 1996, Skiles left the U.S. for the Greek League, joining PAOK in Thessaloniki. Expectations were high for the new arrival from the NBA, but midway through the season injuries and contract problems with key players threatened the season for both PAOK and French coach Michel Gomez.  Still struggling with injury himself, and increasingly at odds with Gomez, Skiles asked to be released from his contract. Instead, president Lakis Alexopoulos fired Gomez and offered Skiles the job. Despite lacking three of their top players due to injury, Skiles led PAOK to a winning record as coach in the remainder of the '96-'97 season, and an unexpected 3rd-place finish in the Greek League, thus assuring a qualification to the following year's Euroleague.

Coaching career

As an assistant
Skiles returned to the NBA for the 1997–98 season as an assistant coach with the Phoenix Suns, being elevated to head coach in 1999.

Phoenix Suns
Under Skiles Phoenix compiled a .595 Won-Loss record and made the playoffs in two of his three years as head coach, including a first-round win over the defending NBA champion San Antonio Spurs in 2000.

Chicago Bulls
After a two-year absence from the game, Skiles came to the Chicago Bulls as head coach in 2003.  He immediately focused on improving the young Bulls' defense and developing greater consistency in a talented but underachieving team. In the first full year under his direction, Chicago limited its opposition to an NBA-best .422 field goal percentage and held their opponents to a franchise record and league high 26 straight games below 100 points. An NBA best 13–3 mark in January 2005 earned Skiles the NBA Eastern Conference Coach of the Month honor.

The 2006 Bulls went 41–41, earning a 7th seed in the playoffs falling to 2nd seeded Miami Heat in  six games. In 2007 the Bulls improved to a 49–33 and again faced the Heat in the first round of the post-season, this time sweeping them in four games. They lost the first three games of the second-round against the top-seeded Detroit Pistons, dropping the last at the United Center after holding a double-digit lead for much of the game. After a two-game rally they were eliminated in six.

The Bulls had high expectations heading into the 2007–08 season.  Mired in last place in the Central Division 25 games in, they were 9–16 when Skiles was fired by general manager John Paxson on December 24, 2007.

Milwaukee Bucks
On April 21, 2008, the Milwaukee Bucks signed their former player Skiles as team's new head coach. He led the Bucks to a 34–48 record in the 2008–09 season. Injuries to key players Michael Redd and Andrew Bogut marred the season, but Skiles was given a show of support by general manager John Hammond.

The next season Skiles had success with an improving, if still young, core led by Bogut at center and Brandon Jennings at point guard. Midseason trades for John Salmons and Jerry Stackhouse gave Skiles both a reliable shooter and a veteran presence on the Bucks' bench. Most NBA prognosticators picked the Bucks to finish last in the Eastern Conference, but the team's defense helped the Bucks beat several of the top teams in the NBA. After a gruesome injury to Bogut's right arm on April 3, 2010, Skiles coached his team to a decisive victory over the heavily favored Phoenix Suns. Three days later Skiles and the Bucks clinched a playoff berth by beating the Chicago Bulls in Chicago. They finished the regular season with a 46–36 mark, their first winning record in seven years. Skiles was frequently mentioned in NBA Coach of the Year talks, eventually finishing second to Oklahoma City Thunder head coach Scott Brooks.

Skiles' five-year stint in Milwaukee ended on January 8, 2013, when he and the Bucks mutually agreed to part ways.

Orlando Magic
On May 29, 2015, former team point guard Skiles joined the Orlando Magic as the franchise's 12th head coach. On May 12, 2016, after head coaching the team for one season, Skiles stepped down as head coach of the Orlando Magic, claiming he was "not the right head coach" for the Magic.

NBA career statistics

Regular season 

|-
| style="text-align:left;"| 
| style="text-align:left;"|Milwaukee
| 13 || 0 || 15.8 || .290 || .214 || .833 || 2.0 || 3.5 || 0.4 || 0.1 || 3.8
|-
| style="text-align:left;"| 
| style="text-align:left;"|Indiana
| 51 || 2 || 14.9 || .411 || .300 || .833 || 1.3 || 3.5 || 0.4 || 0.1 || 4.4
|-
| style="text-align:left;"| 
| style="text-align:left;"|Indiana
| 80 || 13 || 19.6 || .448 || .267 || .903 || 1.9 || 4.9 || 0.8 || 0.0 || 6.8
|-
| style="text-align:left;"| 
| style="text-align:left;"|Orlando
| 70 || 32 || 20.9 || .409 || .394 || .874 || 2.3 || 4.8 || 0.5 || 0.1 || 7.7
|-
| style="text-align:left;"| 
| style="text-align:left;"|Orlando
| 79 || 66 || 34.4 || .445 || .408 || .902 || 3.4 || 8.4 || 1.1 || 0.1 || 17.2
|-
| style="text-align:left;"| 
| style="text-align:left;"|Orlando
| 75 || 63 || 31.7 || .414 || .364 || .895 || 2.7 || 7.3 || 1.0 || 0.1 || 14.1
|-
| style="text-align:left;"| 
| style="text-align:left;"|Orlando
| 78 || 78 || 39.6 || .467 || .340 || .892 || 3.7 || 9.4 || 1.1 || 0.0 || 15.4
|-
| style="text-align:left;"| 
| style="text-align:left;"|Orlando
| 82 || 46 || 28.1 || .429 || .412 || .878 || 2.3 || 6.1 || 0.6 || 0.0 || 9.9
|-
| style="text-align:left;"| 
| style="text-align:left;"|Washington
| 62 || 62 || 33.5 || .455 || .421 || .886 || 2.6 || 7.3 || 1.1 || 0.1 || 13.0
|-
| style="text-align:left;"| 
| style="text-align:left;"|Philadelphia
| 10 || 9 || 23.6 || .351 || .441 || .800 || 1.6 || 3.8 || 0.7 || 0.0 || 6.3
|- class="sortbottom"
| style="text-align:center;" colspan="2"| Career
| 600 || 371 || 28.0 || .435 || .379 || .889 || 2.5 || 6.5 || 0.8 || 0.0 || 11.1

Playoffs 

|-
|style="text-align:left;"|1994
|style="text-align:left;"|Orlando
|2||0||11.5||.500||.000||1.000||0.5||1.5||0.0||0.0||4.5
|- class="sortbottom"
| style="text-align:center;" colspan="2"| Career
| 2 || 0 || 11.5 || .500 || .000 || 1.000 || 0.5 || 1.5 || 0.0 || 0.0 || 4.5

Head coaching record

|-
| style="text-align:left;"|Phoenix
| style="text-align:left;"|
|62||40||22|||| style="text-align:center;"|3rd in Pacific||9||4||5||
| style="text-align:center;"|Lost in Conf. Semifinals
|- 
| style="text-align:left;"|Phoenix
| style="text-align:left;"|
|82||51||31|||| style="text-align:center;"|3rd in Pacific||4||1||3||
| style="text-align:center;"|Lost in First Round
|- 
| style="text-align:left;"|Phoenix
| style="text-align:left;"|
|51||25||26|||| style="text-align:center;"|(resigned)||—||—||—||—
| style="text-align:center;"|—
|- 
| style="text-align:left;"|Chicago
| style="text-align:left;"|
|66||19||47|||| style="text-align:center;"|8th in Central||—||—||—||—
| style="text-align:center;"|Missed Playoffs
|- 
| style="text-align:left;"|Chicago
| style="text-align:left;"|
|82||47||35|||| style="text-align:center;"|2nd in Central||6||2||4||
| style="text-align:center;"|Lost in First Round
|- 
| style="text-align:left;"|Chicago
| style="text-align:left;"|
|82||41||41|||| style="text-align:center;"|4th in Central||6||2||4||
| style="text-align:center;"|Lost in First Round
|- 
| style="text-align:left;"|Chicago
| style="text-align:left;"|
|82||49||33|||| style="text-align:center;"|3rd in Central||10||6||4||
| style="text-align:center;"|Lost in Conf. Semifinals
|- 
| style="text-align:left;"|Chicago
| style="text-align:left;"|
|25||9||16|||| style="text-align:center;"|(fired)||—||—||—||—
| style="text-align:center;"|—
|- 
| style="text-align:left;"|Milwaukee
| style="text-align:left;"|
|82||34||48|||| style="text-align:center;"|5th in Central||—||—||—||—
| style="text-align:center;"|Missed Playoffs
|- 
| style="text-align:left;"|Milwaukee
| style="text-align:left;"|
|82||46||36|||| style="text-align:center;"|2nd in Central||7||3||4||
| style="text-align:center;"|Lost in First Round
|-
| style="text-align:left;"|Milwaukee
| style="text-align:left;"|
|82||35||47|||| style="text-align:center;"|3rd in Central||—||—||—||—
| style="text-align:center;"|Missed Playoffs
|-
| style="text-align:left;"|Milwaukee
| style="text-align:left;"|
|66||31||35|||| style="text-align:center;"|3rd in Central||—||—||—||—
| style="text-align:center;"|Missed Playoffs
|-
| style="text-align:left;"|Milwaukee
| style="text-align:left;"|
||32||16||16|||| style="text-align:center;"|(resigned)||—||—||—||—
| style="text-align:center;"|—
|-
| style="text-align:left;"|Orlando
| style="text-align:left;"|
||82||35||47|||| style="text-align:center;"|5th in Southeast||—||—||—||—
| style="text-align:center;"|Missed Playoffs
|- class="sortbottom"
| style="text-align:left;"|Career
| ||958||478||480|||| ||42||18||24||
|- class="sortbottom"

Quotes
 When asked by a reporter in 2003 to describe what Eddy Curry could do to improve his rebounding, Skiles responded: "Jump."
 When questioned about an encounter between Charlie Villanueva and Anderson Varejão, Skiles responded: "I hope they'll launch an investigation to find the sniper who shot Varejao. I thought there was some acting involved."

See also
List of National Basketball Association players with most assists in a game

Notes

External links
 Career statistics from basketball-reference.com

1964 births
Living people
All-American college men's basketball players
American expatriate basketball people in Greece
American men's basketball players
Basketball coaches from Indiana
Basketball players from Indiana
Chicago Bulls head coaches
Indiana Pacers players
Michigan State Spartans men's basketball players
Milwaukee Bucks draft picks
Milwaukee Bucks head coaches
Milwaukee Bucks players
Orlando Magic expansion draft picks
Orlando Magic head coaches
Orlando Magic players
P.A.O.K. BC coaches
P.A.O.K. BC players
People from La Porte, Indiana
People from Plymouth, Indiana
Philadelphia 76ers players
Phoenix Suns assistant coaches
Phoenix Suns head coaches
Point guards
Washington Bullets players